Marginella joanae is a species of sea snail, a marine gastropod mollusk in the family Marginellidae, the margin snails.

Description

Distribution
This marine species occurs off Mozambique.

References

 Bozzetti L. (2001) Quattro nuove specie (Neogastropoda: Buccinidae, Marginellidae, Terebridae) dal Mozambico. Malacologia Mostra Mondiale 33: 13-16.
 Cossignani T. (2006). Marginellidae & Cystiscidae of the World. L'Informatore Piceno. 408pp.
 Rosado J. & Monteiro A. (2015). A new species of Marginella (Gastropoda: Marginellidae) from South Mozambique. Xenophora Taxonomy. 9: 19-21
 Boyer F. & Rosado J. (2019). Révision du complexe Marginella anna Jousseaume, 1881 dans l'Océan Indien occidental. Xenophora Taxonomy. 23: 3-21. page(s): 13, figs 48-49

joanae
Gastropods described in 2001